Coryanthes verrucolineata is a species of bucket orchid discovered in Peru, and first described in 1989. This orchid is known to occur as an epiphyte at lower altitudes within tropical rainforests.

Like all other orchids in the genus Coryanthes that have been investigated, it is known to be pollinated by male euglossine bees (also known as orchid bees), which are attracted to its large, fragrant flowers.

References

External links

verrucolineata
Orchids of Peru